Działyń  is a village in the administrative district of Gmina Kłecko, within Gniezno County, Greater Poland Voivodeship, in west-central Poland.

The village has a population of 840.

It was the death-place of Wirydianna Fiszerowa, known for her memoirs of 18th and 19th century Poland, in 1826.

References

Villages in Gniezno County